Siddheshwar was a 12th-century mystic and Kannada poet.

Siddheshwar may also refer to:
 Siddheshwar, Achham, a business center in Sanphebagar Municipality, Nepal
 Siddheshwar, Bhojpur, a village development committee in Kosi Zone, Nepal
 Siddheshwar, Baitadi, a village development committee, Mahakali Zone, Nepal
 Siddheshwar, Palpa, a village development committee in Lumbini Zone, Nepal
 Siddheshwar, Raigad, a small village in Maharashtra, India

See also
 Siddheshwar temple (disambiguation)
 
 Siddheshwari, a 1989 Hindi documentary
 Siddheshwari, Sindhuli, Janakpur Zone, Nepal